link title
William George Gabriel Saywell (born 1936) is a Canadian historian. He is the former president and Vice-Chancellor of Simon Fraser University

Early life and education
Saywell was born in 1936 in Regina, Saskatchewan to parents John Ferdinand Tupper Saywell and Vera Marguerite Saywell, alongside his elder brother John Saywell. In 1937, the family moved to British Columbia as his father had received a job position to become Lake Cowichan first high school principal. He attended the University of Toronto (U of T) for his Bachelor of Arts, Master's degree, and PhD. While in his second year at U of T, Saywell enrolled in a course called "the Far East" which sparked his interest China and Japan.

In 1970, once Canada and China established diplomatic relations, Saywell became the first "resident Sinologist" at Canada's embassy in Beijing.

Career
After earning his PhD, he joined the faculty of the Department of East Asian Studies at the University of Toronto. In 1983, Saywell was offered a position as president of Simon Fraser University. During his tenure as SFU's longest-serving president, he helped initiate the development of SFU's downtown Vancouver campus and increased gender equality in SFU's hiring practices. Upon the end of his term as president in 1993, Saywell was named president and chief executive officer of the Asia Pacific Foundation. The next year, he was named a Member of the Order of British Columbia.

In 1999, Saywell was appointed a Member of the Order of Canada. A few years later, he joined the Board of Directors of Palcan Fuel Cells Ltd. In 2009, Simon Fraser University formally named their new arts and social sciences complex Saywell Hall.

References 

Living people
1936 births
People from Regina, Saskatchewan
20th-century Canadian historians
University of Toronto alumni
Academic staff of the University of Toronto
Simon Fraser University people
Academic staff of Simon Fraser University
Members of the Order of Canada
Members of the Order of British Columbia
Businesspeople from Saskatchewan